Ilari Äijälä (born 30 September 1986) is a Finnish retired football player who last played for FC Honka.

Äijälä finished up as the League Cup's top-scorer in 2011 together with Ilja Venäläinen.

He made his debut for the Finnish national team in 2012 against Trinidad and Tobago.

References

External links
 Ilari Äijälä at FC Honka 
 
 
 

1986 births
Living people
Finnish footballers
Finland international footballers
Finland under-21 international footballers
Veikkausliiga players
Helsingin Jalkapalloklubi players
Myllykosken Pallo −47 players
FC Honka players
Klubi 04 players
Kotkan Työväen Palloilijat players
Association football fullbacks
Footballers from Helsinki
21st-century Finnish people